Nancy Genn is an American artist living and working in Berkeley, California known for works in a variety of media, including paintings, bronze sculpture, printmaking, and handmade paper rooted in the Japanese washi paper making tradition. Her work explores geometric abstraction, non-objective form, and calligraphic mark making, and features light, landscape, water, and architecture motifs. She is influenced by her extensive travels, and Asian craft, aesthetics and spiritual traditions.

Early life and education 

Nancy Genn was born in 1929 in San Francisco, California. She recognized early that she would pursue a career as an artist. Her mother, Ruth Wetmore Thompson Whitehouse, was a painter and UC Berkeley alumna who played a leadership role in the San Francisco Women Artists organization. Genn studied at San Francisco Art Institute (then California School of Fine Arts) with painter Hassel Smith, and at the Art Department at the University of California, Berkeley (1948–49) with Professors Margaret Peterson and John Haley, and fellow students Sam Francis and Sonya Rapoport. In 1949 she married Vernon “Tom” Genn, an engineer raised in Japan, with whom she had three children.

Career 

Genn's first noted solo exhibition was in 1955 at Gump's Gallery in San Francisco. She received international recognition through her inclusion in French art critic Michel Tapié’s seminal text Morphologie Autre (1960), which cited her as one of the most important exponents of post-war informal art.

In 1961, Genn began creating bronze sculptures using the lost-wax casting method. Influenced by noted sculptor and family friend Claire Falkenstein, who used open-formed structures in her work, Genn cast forms woven from long grape vine cuttings, and produced vessels, fountains, fire screens, a menorah, a lectern, and, notably, the Cowell Fountain (1966) at UC Santa Cruz. In 1963 her sculptural work was exhibited with Berkeley artists Peter Voulkos and Harold Paris in the influential exhibition Creative Casting curated by Paul J. Smith at the Museum of Contemporary Crafts, New York.

Genn was one of the first American artists to express herself through handmade paper, first receiving wide recognition via exhibitions at Susan Caldwell Gallery, New York, beginning in 1977, and in traveling exhibitions with Robert Rauschenberg and Sam Francis. In 1978-1979, supported by the National Endowment for the Arts and Japan Creative Arts Fellowship, she studied papermaking in Japan, visiting local paper craftspeople, working in Shikenjo studio in Saitama Prefecture, and exhibiting her work in Tokyo. She also learned techniques from Donald Farnsworth of Magnolia Editions, Oakland. She is recognized for the layering and dimensionality of her paper works, achieved through her original tearing technique, known as the ”Genn method.”

Beginning in 1989, Genn shifted focus and began her Planes of Light series of abstract, layered, light-filled paintings and works on paper inspired by architecture and sacred spaces. This work uses asymmetrical abstract planes to suggest architectonic spaces and incorporates collaged fragments of maps and undecipherable scripts. Meanwhile, she continued to make use of a wide variety of media including gouache, casein, mono-printing, vitreography, collage, and ceramics.

Retrospectives of Genn's work include Planes of Light (2003) at the Fresno Art Museum, CA and the extensive exhibition Architecture from Within (2018) at Palazzo Ferro Fini, Venice, Italy, which included an illustrated monograph by curator Francesca Valente. She shows with Marignana Arte Gallery in Venice, Italy.

Selected solo exhibitions 
Genn's solo exhibitions include:

 2022: Nancy Genn : Handmade Paper 1981-1988, Marignana Arte, Venice, Italy
 2021: Inner Landscapes, Marignana Arte, Venice, Italy
 2020: Consonance, Space Mater Gallery, Todi, Italy
 2019: Museo di Ca’ Pesaro, Galleria Internazionale d’ Arte Moderna, Venice, Italy	
 2018: Architecture from Within, Palazzo Ferro Fini, Venice, Italy
 2016: Waterfalls, Vessel Gallery, Oakland, CA
 2003: Fresno Art Museum, Fresno, CA, curated by Jacquelin Pillar
 1999: Mills College Art Museum, Oakland, CA,  curated by Catherine Crum
 1984: Andrew Crispo Gallery, New York, NY
 1983: Kala Art Institute, Berkeley, CA
 1981, 79, 77: Susan Caldwell Gallery, New York, NY
 1980: Inoue Gallery, Tokyo, Japan
 1976: John Bolles Gallery, San Francisco, CA
 1976: Los Angeles Institute of Contemporary Art, Los Angeles, CA
 1971: Oakland Museum of California, Oakland, CA
 1970: Richmond Art Center, Richmond, CA
 1966: Cowell College Gallery, UC Santa Cruz, Santa Cruz, CA
 1963: M. H. de Young Memorial Museum, San Francisco, CA
 1961: San Francisco Museum of Modern Art, San Francisco, CA
 1960: David Cole Gallery, San Francisco, CA
 1955: Gump's Gallery, San Francisco, CA

Selected group exhibitions
Genn's work has been included in the following group exhibitions:

 2022: Poetry is not a Luxury, Minnesota Center for Book Arts, Minneapolis, MN
 2022: The Most Beautiful Mistake You Can Make, Carl Cherry Center for the Arts, Carmel, CA.
 2020: Poetry is not a Luxury, San Francisco Center for the Book, San Francisco, CA
 2020: Breakfast Group, Carl Cherry Center for the Arts, Carmel, CA
 2019: Ideal-Types Chapter 2, Marignana Arte, Venice, Italy
 2019: Poetry is not a Luxury, Center for Book Arts,  New York
 2018: W.W.W. What Walls Want, Marignana Arte, Venice, Italy
 2017: Waterlines, New Museum, Los Gatos, CA
 2014: Breakfast Group, Richmond Art Center, Richmond, CA
 2010: Prints Byte; The Cutting Edge of Printmaking, SOMARTS Gallery, San Francisco, CA
 2006: Reflections on a Legacy: Vitreographs from Littleton Studios, Turchin Center for the Visual Arts, Boone, NC
 2006: Magnolia Editions: Woven Transcriptions, Fresno Art Museum, Fresno, California
 2002: Five Women Artists: Four Generations, One Family, DL Gallery, Seoul, South Korea
 1982: Making Paper, American Craft Museum (traveling exhibition)
 1982: New American Paperworks, curated by Jane M. Farmer, University of Houston (traveling exhibition)
 1982: Elegant Miniatures from San Francisco and Japan, Kyoto, Japan and San Francisco, CA
 1983: Seoul/San Francisco: Prints and Drawings, National Museum of Modern and Contemporary Art, Seoul, Korea
 1973: San Francisco Printmakers, Cincinnati Art Museum, Cincinnati, Ohio
 1971: Contemporary American Prints and Drawings, San Francisco Museum of Art, San Francisco, CA
 1965: Art in Religion, Museum West, San Francisco, CA
 1963: New Images of San Francisco, M. H. de Young Memorial Museum, San Francisco, CA
 1963: Creative Casting, curated by Paul J. Smith, Museum of Contemporary Crafts, NY
 1963: Images of Woman, Oakland Museum of California, Oakland, CA
 1960: Winter Invitational, California Palace of the Legion of Honor, San Francisco, CA
 1955: Twentieth Century Drawings, Stanford Art Gallery, Stanford University, Stanford, CA

Awards 
Genn has received the following awards:

 Council of 100 Distinguished Woman Artist Award, 2003
 Visiting Artist American Academy in Rome, 1989,1994, 2014
 United States/Japan Creative Arts Fellowship, Japan-United States Friendship Commission, 1978-1979
 HUD Award for Design Excellence, U.S. Dept. of Housing and Urban Development, 1968
 Phelan Award, De Young Museum, San Francisco, 1963
 Ellen Hart Bransten Award, San Francisco Women Artists, 1952

Collections 
Genn is represented in the following collections:

 Achenbach Foundation, California Palace of the Legion of Honor, San Francisco, CA
 Albright-Knox Art Gallery, Buffalo, NY
 American Craft Museum, New York, NY
 Brooklyn Museum, Brooklyn, NY
 Berkeley Art Museum and Pacific Film Archive, Berkeley, CA
 Crocker Art Museum, Sacramento, CA
 Fondazione Georgio Cini, Venice, Italy
 Fresno Art Museum, Fresno, CA
 International Center of Aesthetic Research, Italy
 Library of Congress, Washington, DC
 Los Angeles County Museum of Art, CA
 Mills College Art Museum, Oakland, CA
 Museum of Modern Art, New York, New York, NY
 Museo di Ca’ Pesaro, Venice, Italy
 New York Public Library, New York, NY
 New York University Art Collection, NY
 Oakland Museum of California, Oakland, CA
 Palazzo Ferro Fini, Venice, Italy
 San Francisco Museum of Modern Art, CA
 Smithsonian American Art Museum, Washington, DC

References

1929 births
Artists from San Francisco
Papermakers
20th-century American women artists
Living people